The 2006 Toulon Tournament was the 34th edition of the Toulon Tournament, and was held from 15 May to 24 May. It was won by France, after they beat Netherlands in the final.

Results

Group A

Group B

Semi-finals

Third place match

Final

External links
RSSF
Official site

2006
2005–06 in French football
2006 in youth association football